The 134th Motor Rifle Division was a motorized infantry division of the Soviet Army. It existed between 1980 and 1989 and was based in Dushanbe.

History 
The 134th Motor Rifle Division was activated in February 1980 in Dushanbe, subordinated to the Central Asian Military District's 17th Army Corps. It replaced the 201st Motor Rifle Division, which had been transferred to Afghanistan. During the Cold War, it was maintained at 15% strength. In February 1989, it was disbanded and absorbed by the 201st Motor Rifle Division.

Composition 
In 1988, the division was composed of the following units. All units were based at Dushanbe unless noted.
 92nd Motorized Rifle Regiment 
 806th Motorized Rifle Regiment (Kurgan-Tyube)
 1208th Motorized Rifle Regiment (Kulyab)
 401st Tank Regiment 
 Artillery Regiment 
 990th Anti-Aircraft Artillery Regiment 
 837th Separate Missile Battalion (Kurgan-Tyube)
 Separate Anti-Tank Artillery Battalion 
 Separate Reconnaissance Battalion 
 Separate Engineer-Sapper Battalion
 Separate Communications Battalion 
 Separate Chemical Defence Company 
 Separate Equipment Maintenance and Recovery Battalion 
 Separate Medical Battalion 
 Separate Material Supply Battalion

References 

Military units and formations established in 1980
Military units and formations disestablished in 1989
Motor rifle divisions of the Soviet Union